Todd Cooley (born September 7, 1975) is an American football coach.  He the head football coach at the coach at Delta State University. Cooley grew up in Nashville, Arkansas and graduated from Arkansas Tech University with a degree in English. At ATU, Cooley started at quarterback from 1996 to 1997 and was a nominee for the Harlon Hill Award. He began his coaching career in 1998 at Arkansas Tech and has also served as an offensive assistant coach at Northeastern State where he received his Master's degree, Ouachita Baptist, Central Arkansas and Northwestern State. Cooley was announced as the head coach at Delta State on January 25, 2013, after the resignation of Jamey Chadwell. As an assistant Cooley has been part of four conference championship teams and as a head coach, he has won one co-championship. Cooley was named Gulf South Conference Coach of the Year in 2013 and Co-Coach of the Year in 2014.

Delta State created a new contract to the head coach after a successful 2017 season, which saw the team back in the playoffs competing, and off the field managing the team success at school. The new contract extends through the 2021 season.

Head coaching record

References

External links
 Delta State profile

1975 births
Living people
American football quarterbacks
Arkansas Tech Wonder Boys football coaches
Arkansas Tech Wonder Boys football players
Central Arkansas Bears football coaches
Delta State Statesmen football coaches
Northeastern State RiverHawks football coaches
Northwestern State Demons football coaches
Ouachita Baptist Tigers football coaches